The 2017–18 Cyprus Volleyball Division 1 is the 40th season of the Cyprus Volleyball Division 1, the highest tier professional volley league in Cyprus. Omonia were the defending champions.

Regular season
The Regular season of the 2017–18 Cyprus Volleyball Division 1 is held in a round robin format. At season finish, teams occupying positions 1-6 advance to 2017-18 Volleyleague Play-offs.

Source: CVF

Play-off (1-4)
The four teams that finished in the places 1 to 4 in the Regular season, compete in the Play-off (1-4). Omonia started the playoffs with handicap 2–0, and Pafiakos and Anorthosis at 1–1. At the final, Pafiakos started with handicap 2–0. The team with four wins in overall is the winner.

Play-out (5-8)
The four teams that finished in the places 5 to 8 in the Regular season, compete in the Play-out (5-8). APOEL started the playoffs with handicap 2–0, and Anagennisi and AEK Karava at 1–1. At the final, APOEL started with handicap 2–0. The team with four wins in overall is the winner.

Sources
Cyprus Volleyball Federation

2017 in men's volleyball
2018 in men's volleyball
Volleyball in Cyprus
Cyprus